Liptena augusta, the Suffert's liptena, is a butterfly in the family Lycaenidae. It is found in south-eastern Nigeria, Cameroon and Uganda. The habitat consists of forests.

References

Butterflies described in 1904
Liptena